The year 1773 in science and technology involved some significant events.

Astronomy

 October 13 – French astronomer Charles Messier discovers the Whirlpool Galaxy (pictured), an interacting, grand design spiral galaxy located at a distance of approximately 23 million light-years in the constellation Canes Venatici.
 Lagrange presents his work on the secular equation of the Moon to the Académie française, introducing the idea of the potential of a body. He also publishes on the attraction of ellipsoids.

Chemistry
 Hilaire Rouelle discovers urea.
 Carl Wilhelm Scheele and Joseph Priestley independently isolate oxygen, called by Priestley "dephlogisticated air" and Scheele "fire air".
 Antoine Baumé publishes his textbook Chymie expérimentale et raisonnée in Paris.

Exploration
 January 17 – English Captain James Cook becomes the first European explorer to cross the Antarctic Circle.
 Spring – English Captain Tobias Furneaux explores the coast of Van Diemen's Land.
 June 4–September 30 – British Royal Navy Phipps expedition towards the North Pole, which produces the first scientific description of the polar bear and the ivory gull.

Linguistics
 Scottish judge James Burnett, Lord Monboddo, begins publication of Of the Origin and Progress of Language, a contribution to evolutionary ideas of the Enlightenment.

Mathematics
 Lagrange considers a functional determinant of order 3, a special case of a Jacobian. He also proves the expression for the volume of a tetrahedron with one of the vertices at the origin as one sixth of the absolute value of the determinant formed by the coordinates of the other three vertices.

Medicine
 October 12 – North America's first insane asylum opens for 'Persons of Insane and Disordered Minds' in Williamsburg, Virginia.
 Medical Society of London founded by John Coakley Lettsom.
 Louis-Bernard Guyton de Morveau proposes the use of "muriatic acid gas" (hydrogen chloride) for fumigation of buildings.

Technology
 David Hartley patents a method of fireproofing construction for buildings and ships in Britain.

Institutions
 Istanbul Technical University is established (under the original name of Royal School of Naval Engineering) as the world's first comprehensive institution of higher learning dedicated to engineering education.

Awards
 Copley Medal: John Walsh
 John Harrison receives the Longitude prize for his invention of the marine chronometer.

Births
 January 29 – Friedrich Mohs, German mineralogist (died 1839)
 February 24 - Jean Boniface Textoris, French military surgeon (died 1828)
 April 9 – Marie Boivin, French midwife, inventor and obstetrics writer (died 1841)
 May 19 – Arthur Aikin, English chemist and mineralogist (died 1854)
 June 13 – Thomas Young, English physicist (died 1829)
 June 29 (bapt.) – John Bostock, English physician and geologist (died 1846)
 July 23 – Thomas Brisbane, Scottish astronomer and Governor of New South Wales (died 1860)
 August 23 – Abraham Colles, Anglo-Irish surgeon (died 1843)
 October 28 – Simon Goodrich, English mechanical engineer (died 1847)
 December 21 – Robert Brown, Scottish botanist (died 1858)
 December 27 – George Cayley, English pioneer of heavier-than-air flight (died 1857)

Deaths
 July 16 – Nils Rosén von Rosenstein, Swedish pediatrician (born 1706)
 July 23 – George Edwards, English naturalist (born 1693)

References

 
18th century in science
1770s in science